Radim Ditrich (born 13 February 1985) is a retired Czech football player who played in the Czech First League for Zlín.

References

External links
 
 

1985 births
Living people
Czech footballers
Czech Republic under-21 international footballers
Association football defenders
Czech First League players
FC Fastav Zlín players
FC Vysočina Jihlava players